Ridel is a surname. Notable people with the surname include:

Geoffrey Ridel, Duke of Gaeta (died 1084), the Duke of Gaeta as a vassal of the Prince of Capua from 1067 or 1068
Geoffrey Ridel (bishop of Ely) (died 1189), the nineteenth Lord Chancellor of England, from 1162 to 1173
Geoffrey Ridel (royal justice) (died 1120), landholder and royal justice during the reign of King Henry I of England
Gualganus Ridel, the Duke of Gaeta as a vassal of the Prince of Capua in the late 1080s until 1091
Kevin Ridel, American musician and songwriter
Raynald Ridel, the Duke of Gaeta as a vassal of the Prince of Capua from 1086 until his death
Stefanie Ridel (born 1973), American singer, songwriter, and actress
Vladimir Ridel (born 1985), Russian professional football player